The Hairbrain Scheme is a band that formed in 2004. From an early age, the band demonstrated a unique flair for bizarre stage theatrics and morbidly delicious musical experimentation. Incorporating elements of new wave, jazz, hardcore, and classic rock into a cohesive new flavor of pop rock that features heavy use of keyboards and bass guitar, the HBS has consistently demonstrated broad appeal and a strong ability to turn skeptics into admirers.

The band has played some of the West Coast's top venues and has earned opening gigs for a broad range of major acts that includes The Walkmen, Ima Robot, Busta Rhymes, Deadsy, RJD2, Damian Marley, and Mickey Avalon. Scheme members Grant Parsons, Nate Harris, Chris Nava and Dan Bellinger have built a reputation for putting on lively performances that leave a lasting impression on unsuspecting audiences.

The group recently signed to upstart label Gridiron Records and re-located from Santa Barbara to San Francisco, where they continue to promote their music while maintaining a heavy schedule of gigs.

Discography

EPs and Singles
You're A Nation (EP) - (2007)

Full-length Albums
'Sad Am I," Sang the Children' (LP) - (2008)
'Ideuhhhs (B-sides and Rarities) - (Release Date Pending)

References

A Portrait of The Hairbrain Scheme as Young Men

Musical groups from San Francisco
Musical groups established in 2004
2004 establishments in California
Musicians from Santa Barbara, California